Volzhsky District is an administrative and municipal district (raion), one of the twenty-seven in Samara Oblast, Russia. It is located in the center of the oblast. Its administrative center is the city of Samara (which is not administratively a part of the district). Population: 83,377 (2010 Census);

Administrative and municipal status
Within the framework of administrative divisions, Volzhsky District is one of the twenty-seven in the oblast. The city of Samara serves as its administrative center, despite being incorporated separately as a city of oblast significance—an administrative unit with the status equal to that of the districts.

As a municipal division, the district is incorporated as Volzhsky Municipal District. The city of oblast significance of Samara is incorporated separately from the district as Samara Urban Okrug.

References

Notes

Sources

Districts of Samara Oblast

